Mary Jewett Telford (March 18, 1839 – August 5, 1906) was a humanitarian who worked as a nurse at Hospital No. 8 in Nashville, Tennessee, during the American Civil War. In her later years, Mary was a published author, editor of numerous journals, lecturer on the temperance circuit and charter member of the Woman's Relief Corps, an auxiliary to the Grand Army of the Republic.

Early life 
Mary Jewett Telford was born in Seneca, New York on March 18, 1839. Mary’s father and mother, Dr. Lester Jewett and Hannah Southwick Jewett, were already parents to five children. After Mary’s birth, another four children would join the clan. The Jewetts lost infants Ruth and Oakley within days of each other in 1846, probably of diphtheria or scarlet fever. After their burial at Old No. 9 Cemetery in Seneca, the family made the decision to move to Lima Township, Michigan, to be closer to Lester’s brothers, who had migrated there in the 1820s. In Lima, Lester built a cobblestone house that stands today. Nathan, Mary’s youngest sibling, was born in Lima.

Civil War 
By the age of 14, Mary was teaching in the district school. Later, she spent one year teaching at Morganfield, Kentucky, before returning home to Michigan. It was there that her younger brother, William T. Jewett, enlisted in the 4th Michigan Cavalry. Four months later, William was dead from typhoid fever. Then Mary’s elder brother, Edward Jewett, joined the 124th Ohio Infantry.

Mary longed to assist the soldiers convalescing from their wounds. Although she was denied a nursing position by the U.S. Sanitary Commission because she was too young, she persisted. Michigan Governor Austin Blair, a friend of her father’s, gave her a special permit and Mary was off to war.

She working at Hospital No. 8 in Nashville, Tennessee, for eight months, the sole woman in a hospital occupied by six hundred soldiers. Mary did her best to keep up with the requests for water and the calls for assistance of all kinds. On more than one occasion, soldiers sought her out many years after the war to thank her for being their angel during those dark days of war. Mary was a strong woman, but after a year, she left the nursing job she loved, shattered in health and spirits.

Post-war years 
Her loved ones in Michigan awaited her return. In addition to her family, there was a soldier who waited for Mary – her sweetheart, Jacob Telford of the 15th Indiana Infantry Regiment. Mary and Jacob married on July 8, 1864, at her home in Lima, Michigan. Jacob, nearly six years older than Mary, was also native to Seneca, New York. One day on her daily rounds at Hospital No. 8, she came across him again and recognized his clear blue eyes and shy grin. Jacob had been severely wounded at Murfreesboro, Tennessee.

The Telfords are listed in the 1870 census as living in Grinnell, Iowa. Residing with them were two girls, Mattie Stokes and Olive Montgomery. Mary and Jacob adopted several girls orphaned during the Civil War.

Contributions to society 
A move from Iowa to Denver, Colorado, was made in 1873 in hopes of improving Mary’s asthmatic condition. In Denver, Mary’s abilities took wing. A writer since her teenage years, Mary’s short children’s story, "Tom", was published in St. Nicholas Magazine in 1880. In July 1883, Mary became a charter member of the Woman’s Relief Corps (an auxiliary of the Grand Army of the Republic), which was dedicated to assisting veterans, their wives and their children. This organization is still in existence and continues to aid veterans and their families. Later the same year, Mary was appointed to the Child-Saving Work committee on the Board of Charities and Corrections. In 1884, she founded, edited and published The Challenge, a temperance journal which espoused the ideas of the Woman’s Christian Temperance Union (W.C.T.U.). In the late 1880s, Mary became the editor of the Colorado Farmer journal, while contributing articles to newspapers in cities around the country.

The United States House Committee on Invalid Pensions passed a bill on May 24, 1892 granting a pension to Mary Jewett Telford, based on her service as a nurse during the Civil War. Less than two weeks later, Mary applied for her pension. The money was surely welcomed, considering that the Telfords’ income consisted of Jacob’s $8 a month government pension from his service in the 15th Indiana Infantry, and from any money Mary brought in with her writing and editing ventures.

She continued writing and editing and began to tour the country as a lecturer on the temperance circuit. She counted W.C.T.U. founder Frances Willard as a friend.

Sometime in late 1900 or 1901, Mary and Jacob moved once again, to McMinnville, Tennessee. It was there, in 1905, that Mary’s beloved husband Jacob died. In keeping with his wishes, Mary had his body brought to Stones River National Cemetery, the former battlefield on which he had been wounded years before, for burial.

Final years 
Less than twelve months after the loss of her husband of 41 years, Telford discovered she had a health issue which required surgery. Sent to the Hinsdale Sanitarium in Hinsdale, Illinois for care, Mary Jewett Telford passed quietly away on August 5, 1906 following a critical operation. She was buried in Illinois. Nine months later Mary’s older sister, Catherine Jewett Wilkinson, brought Mary’s remains back East and interred her beside their mother Hannah Southwick Jewett at South Perinton Cemetery in Perinton, New York.

References

External links 
Fairport-East Rochester Post: Civil War nurse remembered during national Women’s History Month

American children's writers
People from Nashville, Tennessee
1839 births
1906 deaths
People from Seneca, New York
19th-century American women writers
American Civil War nurses
American women nurses
Woman's Relief Corps people
Wikipedia articles incorporating text from A Woman of the Century